Marcus Thomas (born September 23, 1985) is a former American football defensive tackle. Thomas played college football for the University of Florida.

Early years

Thomas was born in Yokosuka, Japan.  He attended Mandarin High School in Jacksonville, Florida, where he was an all-state high school football player for the Mandarin Mustangs.

College career

Thomas accepted an athletic scholarship to attend the University of Florida in Gainesville, Florida, where he played for coach Urban Meyer's Florida Gators football team from 2003 to 2006.  In November 2006, he was kicked off the team for violating the terms of his reinstatement from a drug-related suspension.  He missed curfew, went on an unapproved out of town trip, and skipped a mandatory drug counseling session.  Thomas was an anthropology major.

Professional career

Denver Broncos

Thomas was picked in the fourth round with the 121st overall pick in the 2007 NFL draft by the Denver Broncos.  On July 11, Thomas signed a 4-year contract with the club worth a reported $3 million.

New York Giants

On August 16, 2012, Thomas signed a one-year deal with the New York Giants. On August 31, 2012, Thomas was released by the New York Giants.

Toronto Argonauts
On October 16, 2013, Thomas was signed by the Toronto Argonauts of the Canadian Football League to a practice roster agreement. On February 10, 2015, Thomas became a free agent.

See also

 List of Florida Gators in the NFL Draft

References

External links
 Toronto Argonauts profile 
  Marcus Thomas  – Florida Gators player profile

1985 births
Living people
African-American players of Canadian football
American football defensive tackles
Denver Broncos players
Florida Gators football players
New York Giants players
People from Yokosuka, Kanagawa
Players of American football from Jacksonville, Florida
Mandarin High School alumni
Toronto Argonauts players
21st-century African-American sportspeople
20th-century African-American people